The Women's 50m Breaststroke event at the 10th FINA World Aquatics Championships swam on 26–27 July 2003 in Barcelona, Spain. Preliminary heats swam during the morning session on July 26, with the top-16 finishers advancing to Semifinals that evening. The top-8 finishers then advanced to swim again in the Final the next evening.

At the start of the event, the World (WR) and Championship (CR) records were:
WR: 30.57 swum by Zoë Baker (Great Britain) on July 30, 2002 in Manchester, UK.
CR: 30.84 swum by Xuejuan Luo (China) on July 27, 2001 in Fukuoka, Japan

Results

Final

Seminfinals

Preliminaries

References

Swimming at the 2003 World Aquatics Championships
2003 in women's swimming